What the Rose did to the Cypress is a Persian fairy tale.  Andrew Lang included it in The Brown Fairy Book (1904), with the note "Translated from two Persian MSS. in the possession of the British Museum and the India Office, and adapted, with some reservations, by Annette S. Beveridge."

Alternate names
The story is also named Rose and Cypress, Gul o Sanaubar, Qissa Gul-o-Sanaubar or What the Rose did to the Pine.

The tale is described as having "Hindustani" origin and was previously translated to French by Garcin de Tassy, titled Rose & Cyprès.

A German translation of the tale, named Rose und Cypresse, was written by Felix Liebrecht and published in Orient und Occident.

Synopsis
A king had three sons. The oldest went hunting and chased a deer, giving orders that it should be captured rather than killed. It led him to a sandy waste where his horse died.  He found a tree with a spring beneath it and drank. A faqir asked him what he did there. He told him his story and asked the faqir's,  repeating when the faqir put him off, until the faqir told him he had been a king, and his seven sons had all tried to win a princess whose hand could only be won by answering the riddle, "What did the rose do to the cypress?" and died for their failure.  His grief sent him into the desert.

This inspired the son with a love for the same princess. His attendants found him and brought him back, but he grew ill for love, and his confidants found this out and revealed it to the king. The king made arrangements for him to go.  At the city, the princess's father tried to dissuade him. He was asked, failed, and was executed. His second brother followed and likewise died.

Finally the third went, but having reached the city, he saw his brothers' heads and went to a nearby village, where he took shelter with an ancient, childless couple. Disguising himself, he searched the city for the secret, and found he could get into the princess's garden by a stream. There he hid, but when the princess sent her maids for water, they saw his reflection and were terrified. The princess had her nurse bring him to her. He answered her questions at random, convincing her that he was mad, but his beauty made her protect him as her own. Dil-aram, who had seen him first, grew fond of him and begged him to tell her what he was about; finally, he was convinced she was in love with him, told her his story, and promised to marry her and keep her among his favorites. She could not answer the riddle, but knew that a certain African from Waq of the Caucasus had told the princess it.

The prince set out to Waq of the Caucasus. An old man advised him on how to arrive there, despite the jinns, demons, and peris. He should take this road until it split, then take the middle road for a day and a night, where he would find a pillar. He should do what was written on the pillar. He found a warning where the roads split, against the middle road, but took it and came to a garden. He had to pass a giant man to reach it, and a woman there tried to persuade him from his way. When she failed, she enchanted him into a deer.

As a deer, he came to lead a band of deer. He tried to jump from the enchanted garden but found that it would bring him back where he had jumped from. The ninth time, however, the other deer vanished. A beautiful woman there took him as a pet. He wept, and the woman realized he had been enchanted by her sister. She turned him back, gave him a bow and arrows, a sword, and a dagger, that had all belonged to heroes, and told him that he must seek out the home of the Simurgh, but she could not direct him to it.

He obeyed her directions about the Place of Gifts, where wild animals lived, and a lion-king gave him some hairs, saying he must burn them for aid. He disobeyed her directions to avoid the castle of clashing swords, because whatever was fated to happen to him would happen, and fought the people there. With the lion's aid, he defeated them, rescuing a princess, and gave it all into the lion's care until he was done with his quest.

He found the Simurgh's nest, where only the young ones were, and killed a dragon there; then he fed the hungry young birds on it, and they slept, being full. When their parents returned, the lack of noise convinced them that the prince had killed and eaten their young, but the mother bird insisted on checking to discover the truth, and the young ones woke. The Simurgh carried him to Waq, and gave him three feathers, any of which would summon him.

At Waq, he learned that only the king knew the riddle and went to court.  He gave the king a diamond and said it was his last treasure. The king wished to please him, but the prince wanted only the answer to the riddle. When he asked, the king said he would have killed anyone else, but when the king went on asking what the prince wanted, the prince refused to ask for anything.  Finally, the king told him that he could have what he wanted, if he consented to die afterward. He was the cypress, and his wife, whom he had brought before them in chains and rags, was the rose. He had once rescued peris and restored their sight, and in return, they had arranged for his marriage to a peri princess. She had betrayed him, riding off every night to a man who beat her. The king had killed him and his fellows, except the one who escaped to tell the princess with the riddle.  He then told the prince to prepare for execution.  The prince asked only for a final washing, but when washing, he summoned the Simurgh, and it carried him off.

He returned.  On the way, he married the princess from the castle of clashing swords, and the woman who had disenchanted him.  At the city, he demanded the African whom the princess hid beneath her throne to confirm the truth of his words.  He told the story, and the king having found the African, he confirmed it.  Instead of marrying the princess, he took her captive, had the head decently buried, and sent for Dil-aram.

At home, the prince had the African torn apart between four horses.  The princess begged for mercy; those who had died had been fated to die, and it was her fate to be his.  He forgave her, married her and Dil-aram, and lived happily with his four wives.

Variants
Orientalist Garcin de Tassy himself noted, in an 1868 publication, that he knew at least six translations of the story: one from a man named "Nem Chand" or "Prem Chand", which he translated in 1860, in Revue orientale et américaine; another supposedly translated from Persian; at least two versions penned by escrivener Ahmad Ali.

Scholars point that the Persian tale is parallel to the story The Splendid Tale of Prince Diamond, and The Tender Tale of Prince Yasamîn and Princess Almond, both present in The Arabian Nights.

A variant from the Caucasus region was collected by Adolf Dirr, titled Von Balai und von Boti.

In a Georgian variant, Gulambara and Sulambara, after a prince is banished by his father and meets a mysterious yet helpful boy in his wanderings, both reach a city. One day, the prince goes out and sees a tower with a row of spiked heads nearby. The prince asks the meaning of a gruesome sight: the princess asks any potential suitor a riddle, "Who are Gulambara and Sulambara?". The prince knows Gulambara and Sulambara are names of flowers, but he is given a chance to answer correctly.

Analysis
The tale of a princess who challenges her suitors with deadly riddles is similar to the story of Turandot. As such, it belongs in a series of folktales involving riddles.

The heroic prince helping the mythical creature and it repaying the favour is a motif that echoes the Roman fable of Androcles and the Lion.

Angelo de Gubernatis analysed the motif of the rose and the cypress of the story, postulating that the cypress is a phallic symbol or representative of the male prince, and the rose the symbol of the female beloved.

Adaptations
A number of films have been made in India based on the fable. These include: Gul Sanobar (1928) silent film by Homi Master, Gul Sanobar (1934) remade in sound by Homi Master, Gul Sanobar (1953) by Aspi Irani.

Gul Sanobar, an Indian television series based on the legend was aired by the national public broadcaster Doordarshan on DD National in the early 2000s.

See also
 Turandot
 Riddle tales

References

Bibliography
 Goldberg, Christine. Turandot's Sisters: A Study of the Folktale AT 851. Garland Folklore Library, 7. New York and London: Routledge 2019. [New York: Garland, 1993].
 Krappe, A. Haggerty. "Arthur and Gorlagon." Speculum 8, no. 2 (1933): 209-22. doi:10.2307/2846751.
 Lecoy, Félix. "Un épisode du Protheselaus et le conte du mari trompé". In: Romania, tome 76 n°304, 1955. pp. 477–518. [DOI: https://doi.org/10.3406/roma.1955.3478] www.persee.fr/doc/roma_0035-8029_1955_num_76_304_3478
 Perrin, J.-M. "L'afghon, dialecte indo-aryen parlé au Turkestan (à propos d'un livre récent de I. M. Oranski)". In: Bulletin de l'Ecole française d'Extrême-Orient. Tome 52 N°1, 1964. pp. 173–181. [DOI: https://doi.org/10.3406/befeo.1964.1594] www.persee.fr/doc/befeo_0336-1519_1964_num_52_1_1594
 Pierer's Universal-Lexikon, Band 8. Altenburg. 1859. pp. 387–391

Further reading
 Scheub, Harold. Shadows: Deeper into Story. Parallel Press/University of Wisconsin-Madison Libraries. 2009. pp. 165–170.

External links
What the Rose did to the Cypress

Persian fairy tales
Riddles
Traditional stories
Female characters in fairy tales
Legendary birds
Persian legendary creatures
Indian fairy tales
Indian folklore
Indian legends